Indian playback singer Sonu Nigam has recorded numerous albums and songs. Below are his mainstream releases. He has also released several devotional albums including Maha Ganesha (2008). He sang for several Ambedkarite and Buddhist albums including Buddha Hi Buddha hai (2010) and Siddhartha-The Lotus Blossom (2013).  He covered the songs of famous Ghazal singer Pankaj Udhas in Best of Pankaj Udas.

Albums

Singles

English singles

Television serial songs

Hindi film songs

1990s

2000's

2010

2020s

Replaced film songs

Hindi non-film songs

Kannada songs

1990s

2000s

2010s

2020s

Bengali songs

Non-film songs

Marathi songs

Telugu songs

Tamil songs

Odia songs

Film songs

Non-film songs

Malayalam songs

Gujarati songs

Bhojpuri songs

Tulu songs

Nepali songs

References

Discographies of Indian artists
Discography
Lists of songs recorded by Indian singers